Sakala is an Indian newspaper of Odia language which is published daily from Bhubaneswar, Odisha. It is one of the fastest growing Odia newspapers in Odisha. It is published from the capital city of Bhubaneswar, as well as from Cuttack, Berhampur, Rourkela, Sambalpur, Balasore, Jajpur, Jeypore, and  Angul. The first edition of this newspaper was published on December 1, 2020, in Bhubaneswar. Dr. Umakanta Mishra, joined as editor of the Sakala.

Sakala also has the largest readership in the state of Odisha.

References

External links
 Sakala.in
 Sakalaepaper.com

Odia-language newspapers
Daily newspapers published in India
Publications established in 1984
1984 establishments in Orissa
Mass media in Bhubaneswar